The 2004–05 Mississippi State basketball team represented Mississippi State University as a member of the Southeastern Conference during the 2004–05 college basketball season. Under seventh-year head coach Rick Stansbury, the team played their home games at Humphrey Coliseum in Starkville, Mississippi. Mississippi State finished third in the SEC West Division regular season standings. The Bulldogs were knocked out in the quarterfinal round of the SEC tournament, losing to Florida. The team received an at-large bid to the NCAA tournament as No. 9 seed in the Austin region. After an opening round win over No. 8 seed Stanford, the Bulldogs were defeated by No. 1 seed Duke. Mississippi State finished the season with a record of 23–11 (9–7 SEC).

Roster

Schedule and results 

|-
!colspan=9 style=| Non-conference Regular season

|-
!colspan=9 style=| SEC Regular season

|-
!colspan=9 style=| SEC Tournament

|-
!colspan=9 style=| NCAA Tournament

Rankings

References 

Mississippi State
Mississippi State Bulldogs men's basketball seasons
Mississippi State
Bull
Bull